Ri Hyong-mu (born 4 November 1991) is a North Korean footballer who plays as a defender.

References

External links

Ri Hyong-mu at DPRKFootball

1991 births
Living people
North Korean footballers
North Korea international footballers
Association football midfielders